Renna may refer to:

Renna, Chinese for Mimana, Korea
John Renna (1920–1998), American Republican Party politician
Bill Renna (1924–2014), outfielder in Major League Baseball from 1953–1959
Stacie Lynn Renna (born 1973), American film, television, and stage actress
Tony Renna (1976–2003), American race car driver who raced in the Indy Racing League IndyCar Series
Patrick Renna (born 1979), American actor who began his career in the film The Sandlot